Athavanad  is a village and Grama Panchayat  in the Malappuram district, the Indian state of Kerala.

Geography 
Puthanathani is the main town there, sited on National Highway 17 between Kottakkal and Valanchery. Roads to Vailathur (and hence Tirur) and Thirunavaya run through Puthanathani. Many people from Puthanathani and surrounding areas work overseas, mostly in Persian Gulf countries.

History 
In ancient times, the region was under the feudal lords Azhvanchery Thamprakkal. In Malayalam, "Athavanad" is the abbreviation of "Azhvanchery Thambrakkal Vazhunna Nadu". The Zamorin of Calicut also controlled the area.

Demographics

As of the 2011 Census of India, Athavanad had a population of 41187, with 19298 males and 21889females.

Athavanad Grama Panchayat Election 2020

Local Administration 2020 
The region is administered by the Athavanad Grama Panchayat. It is composed of 22 wards:

Culture
Athavanad village is predominantly a Muslim area.  Hindus exist in comparatively smaller numbers.  People gather in mosques for prayers and remain after prayers to discuss social and cultural issues.

Business and family issues are also sorted out during evening meetings. The Hindu minority of this area keeps their rich traditions by celebrating various festivals in their temples. In Athavanad, Hindu rituals are done with a regular devotion, as in other parts of Kerala.

Transport
Athavanad village connects to other parts of India through the town of Kottakkal.  National highway No.66 passes through Tanur and the northern stretch connects to Goa and Mumbai. The southern stretch connects to Cochin and Trivandrum.

State Highway No.28 starts from Nilambur and connects to Ooty, Mysore and Bangalore through Highways.12,29 and 181. National Highway No.966 connects to Palakkad and Coimbatore.  The nearest airport is at Kozhikode.  The nearest major railway station is at Tirur.

Education
The Village has several educational institutions, from the school level to higher education. Institutions include:

 Athavanad Parithi High school
 Athavanad Mattummal Higher Secondary School
 GMHS Karippol
 Majmau Thazkiyyathul Islamia
 Majmau Higher secondary school
 Majmau Shareeath College
 Majmau Lower Primary School
 Majmau Da'awa College
 Majmau Thazkiyyathul Islamia Hiflul Quran College
 ZMHS Poolamangalam
 Markazu Tharbiyathul Islam Higher Secondary School
 Markaz Residential School
 Markazu Tharbiyathul Teachers Training Center
 Markazu Tharbiyathul Islam 
 Hifz college
 Markazu Tharbiyathul Islam B-Ed
 Badariyya Arabic college Palathani
 PMSA orphanage hospital athavanad kattilangadi
 Markaz Arts And Science College Karthala
 Athavanadu
 KMCT Polytechnic College
 KMCT Law College
 Majmau Orphanage
 Mohammed Ali Shihab Thangal Memorial Arts And Science College
 AMUPS PUNNATHALA
 AMUPS poolamangalam
 Gups Karipol

Ayyappanov waterfalls 

Ayyappanov Waterfalls is an Athavanad waterfall in the Athavanad village of Tirur taluk in Kerala, India. It is 4 kilometers from Puthanathani town and attracts tourists from various parts of Kerala. This is a seasonal waterfall. During Summer, water flow is low

See also
Athavanad
Azhvanchery Thamprakkal
Puthanathani
Ayyapanov Waterfalls
Kuttippuram Block Panchayat

References

http://trend.kerala.gov.in/views/index.php

Villages in Malappuram district
Kottakkal area